Films by american production company Outerbanks Entertainment.

2000s

2010s

2020s

References 

Outerbanks Entertainment
O
Outerbanks Entertainment